Suaza is a town and municipality in the Huila Department, Colombia.

References

External Links
 Municipal Mayor's Office of Suaza in Huila

Municipalities of Huila Department